Greygarth Hall is a catered inter-university hall of residence for men, situated in Victoria Park, south Manchester, England. It is one of the halls on the "Rusholme campus" within 3 minutes walk of the famous Curry Mile. Greygarth Hall was founded in 1961, and in 2010-11 was extensively refurbished. The hall is a grade II listed building and was a University of Manchester Licensed Hall from 1965 until the university abolished the 'licensed' state in the early 2000s.

Greygarth is a voluntary organization run by residents of Greygarth Hall University Residence, which is promoted by the Greygarth Association, a registered charity working for the advancement of education in the light of Christian principles. Among the various activities that take place at Greygarth, those of a spiritual nature are entrusted to Opus Dei, a personal Prelature of the Catholic Church.

Overview 
Greygarth Hall is a corporate undertaking of Opus Dei, a personal prelature of the Catholic Church. It is, however, open to students of all faiths and backgrounds. Greygarth has a large range of facilities; it has its own library, computer and laptop rooms, newspaper reading room, a large garden including a 5-a-side football pitch and a TV lounge. In Autumn 2011, Greygarth Hall reopened after a year of extensive refurbishment.

Spiritual activities
Daily Mass is celebrated in an Oratory.

Other spiritual activities are organised such as seminars on Christian faith, retreats, and praying of the Rosary.

Notable alumni
Roland Joffé stayed at Greygarth Hall while studying in Manchester

See also

Listed buildings in Manchester-M14

References

External links
 Greygarth Hall website

1961 establishments in England
Catholic Church in England
University of Manchester halls of residence
Grade II listed buildings in Manchester